A Paraklesis or Supplicatory Canon in the Byzantine Rite, is a service of supplication for the welfare of the living. It is addressed to a specific Saint or to the Most Holy Theotokos whose intercessions are sought through the chanting of the supplicatory canon together with psalms, hymns, and litanies.

The most popular Paraklesis is that in which the supplicatory canon and other hymns are addressed to the Most Holy Theotokos (the Mother of God). There are two forms of this service: the Small Paraklesis (composed by Theosterictus the Monk in the 9th century), and the Great Paraklesis (composed by Emperor Theodore II Laskaris in the 13th century). During the majority of the year, only the Small Paraklesis to the Theotokos is chanted.  However, during the Dormition Fast (August 1—14, inclusive), the Typikon prescribes that the Small and Great Paraklesis be chanted on alternate evenings, according to the following regulations: 
If August 1 falls on a Monday through Friday, the cycle begins with the Small Paraklesis. If August 1 falls on a Saturday or Sunday, the cycle begins with the Great Paraklesis.
On the eves of Sundays (i.e., Saturday nights) and on the eve of the Transfiguration (the night of August 5) the Paraklesis is omitted.
On Sunday nights, the Great Paraklesis is always used unless it is the eve of Transfiguration.

Moleben

In the Russian Orthodox Church, the equivalent of a Paraklesis is the moleben, molében (Slavonic: молебенъ), molieben, service of intercession or service of supplication, which is similar in structure, except that the canon is omitted, retaining only the refrains and Irmoi of the third, sixth and ninth odes. When the full service itself is performed, it is called the "Supplicatory Canon" (Molebnyj Kanon). It is used in honor of Jesus Christ, the Mother of God, a Feast, or a particular saint or martyr.

The present form of the Moleben originated in Slavic culture, but its use is now widespread both in Europe and in the Orthodox and Byzantine Catholic churches that follow the Slavic tradition.  Whereas the Paraklesis includes as its principal focus the canon to the subject being honored, the Moleben omits the odes of the canon and includes only the simple refrains that occur between the odes.

Molebens are traditionally served by a priest, but may also be done as a reader's service (i.e., the format used when served by a layperson or deacon; omitting or replacing those portions normally chanted by the priest). It is the custom to celebrate a moleben service only in honor of a glorified saint, and when possible the service is done in front of an icon of the person or feast to whom the Moleben is celebrated. Sometimes an Akathist will be chanted during the celebration of a Moleben.

The general outline of a Moleben is based on the service of Matins, as served on a feast day, complete with a Gospel reading.

Molebens may be (a) occasional (i.e., served according to need), for instance for one who is ill or going on a journey; they may be (b) commemorative (assigned to a particular day), such as the beginning of the new year, or when children begin school; or they may be (c) devotional (in honor of a particular saint).

Molebens are very important in the Russian Orthodox tradition, and an entire volume of the Great Euchologion is devoted to them. Most molebens are served in the church, but they may also be served in homes, fields, schools or other appropriate places.

Molebens may also be served in processions. The procession may be going to a particular place, such as during a pilgrimage, or it may circle around the outside of the church building (this is very common on the feast day of the Patron Saint of the church or monastery, and during Bright Week). When a processional Moleben circles around the church, very often the procession will pause on each of the four sides of the building, and the bishop or priest will sprinkle holy water on the church, the icons and people that are taking part in the procession.

See also
Dormition of the Theotokos
Akathist

External links
 The Service of the Small Paraklesis (text of the service with audio by Eikona) from the Greek Orthodox Archdiocese of America Website
 The Paraclesis Service Explained St Nicholas Russian Orthodox Church, Dallas, Texas 
 Paraklesis article from OrthodoxWiki
The Order of the General Moleben, according to the usage of the Russian Orthodox Church Outside of Russia
Tropar & Kontakion for Royal Martyrs & New Martyrs Of Russia compiled by Fr. Demetrios Serfes
Photo: Blessing with holy water during Moleben
Photo: Procession around the Church

Byzantine Rite
Christian prayer
Eastern Christian liturgy
Christian processions